Richard Troyanovich Meves (Ричард Троянович фон Мевес) (1839–1901) was a Lieutenant general in the Imperial Russian Army who fought in the Russo-Turkish War (1877–78).

Career 
Born in 1839, Meves studied with the Konstantinovsky Cadet Corps, and on 13 August 1853 he became an officer in the Pavlovsky Regiment of the Imperial Guards. In 1863, he participated in the suppression of the Polish uprising and on 12 June was awarded the Order of St. Stanislav, 3rd degree, with sword and bow.

In the Russian-Turkish war of 1877–1878, Meves was wounded, receiving the Order of St. Vladimir, 4th degree. with the sword and bow. During the march through the Balkans, he received the Order of St. Anne, 2nd degree, with swords. On 12 April 1878 he was promoted to Major general (with seniority from 14 January 1878).

In 1878 Meves was in command of the Imperial Guards 2nd rifle battalion and, in 1884 the Pavlovsky Regiment. In 1885 he was appointed Chief of Staff of the 14th Army Corps. In 1894 he headed the 23rd Infantry Division. In 1897 Lieutenant General Meves was appointed Chief of the 2nd Guards Infantry Division and, in 1899, commander of the 20th Army Corps.

References 

1839 births
1901 deaths
Military personnel of the Russian Empire
Russian people of the January Uprising
Russian military personnel of the Russo-Turkish War (1877–1878)